Sárosd is a village in Fejér county, Hungary.

People 
 Gyula Farkas (mathematician), famous for Farkas' lemma

External links

  in Hungarian
 Street map 

Populated places in Fejér County
Shtetls